The FN EVOLYS is a general purpose machine gun designed by FN Herstal, chambered for 5.56×45mm NATO and 7.62×51mm NATO ammunition. It is produced since 2021. The EVOLYS was designed to be lighter and more ergonomic than other machine guns, such as the FN Minimi.

History 
On 22 April 2021, FN Herstal created a teaser trailer, showcasing a new machine gun with the title "A New Chapter Begins". On May 6, FN Herstal released a 20 minute promotional video, discussing the new design, including its technical aspects, and revealing its name: the EVOLYS. In September 2021, the EVOLYS was first displayed to the public at the Defence and Security Equipment International trade show in London, and it began to enter pre-production the same month.

Design 
The EVOLYS was designed from the ground up for use in urban warfare, which has become more common, and which holds specific requirements. Rather than taking the base of fire from a squad, the EVOLYS was designed to improve the amount of firepower that could be provided by a single soldier. It is select fire, with the option between semi-automatic and fully automatic fire modes. The EVOLYS uses a lateral feed mechanism with the belt at a 45° angle, and it is fully ambidextrous, with all its controls accessible on both its sides, and it can be loaded with one hand.

The firing operation is unusual as it uses an open bolt, firing with a separate hammer upside down inside the upper receiver. This prevents accidents and runaways as even if the bolt moves forward, it won't fire unless the hammer is released by a trigger pull. A single accessory rail mounted on the top of the receiver allows for the mounting of various optics, allowing for better target acquisition. Previous machine gun designs had to use multiple rails, which were not integral to the receiver, making the attachment and usage of optics more difficult. Similarly, because of the increased use of suppressors, the EVOLYS was designed to be capable of having a suppressor permanently fitted, without it affecting the weapon's performance.

The EVOLYS was constructed using 3D printing and polymers, which help to reduce its weight. At , the EVOLYS is up to 30% lighter than competing machine guns such as the FN Minimi. The EVOLYS is chambered for 5.56×45mm and 7.62×51mm, with 6.5mm Creedmoor and .260 Remington variants in development for potential use by special forces.

Users 
 : French Special Forces
 : British Army for test purposes
 : United States Army for test purposes in Next Generation Squad Weapon Program

See also
 Knight's Armament Company LAMG
IWI Negev
 QJS-161
 QJY-201
 RPL-20

References 

FN Herstal firearms
Weapons and ammunition introduced in 2021
Machine guns of Belgium
5.56×45mm NATO machine guns
7.62×51mm NATO machine guns